Thérèse Liotard (born 6 May 1949 in Lille, Nord, France) is a French actress best known for her role in the 1990 film My Father's Glory (La Gloire de mon père, de Marcel Pagnol). She is known on British television for her appearance in the BBC series Bergerac.

She made her French television debut as a presenter on ORTF in 1970.

In the 1980 film Death Watch, her English dialogue was dubbed by Julie Christie.

Filmography
See also Thérèse Liotard, full filmography and theatre appearances

Awards
 16th César Awards, nomination for best supporting actress for My Father's Glory and My Mother's Castle

References

External links

Thérèse Liotard at notre Cinéma

1949 births
French film actresses
French stage actresses
French television actresses
Living people
Mass media people from Lille
French television presenters
French women television presenters